Molly Cheek (born March 2, 1950) is an American actress. A Connecticut College graduate she worked in ‘dinner-theater productions and summer stock’  before finding television and film work.

Cheek is best known for her roles in the television sitcoms as Nancy Bancroft on It's Garry Shandling's Show (1986–1990), and as Nancy Henderson on Harry and the Hendersons (1991–1993). She also had main roles in a number of short-lived television shows, and guest starred on St. Elsewhere, Diagnosis Murder, Family Ties, Murder, She Wrote, Once and Again, and Cold Case.

Cheek played the mother of main character Jim Levenstein in the 1999 film American Pie and in its sequels. She also has appeared in films Purple People Eater (1988), April's Shower (2003), A Lot like Love (2005), Good Time Max (2007), and Drag Me to Hell (2009).

Filmography

Film

Television

References

External links

1950 births
Actresses from New York (state)
20th-century American actresses
21st-century American actresses
American film actresses
American television actresses
Living people
People from Bronxville, New York
Connecticut College alumni